The following is an alphabetical list of members of the United States House of Representatives from the state of Connecticut.  For chronological tables of members of both houses of the United States Congress from the state (through the present day), see United States congressional delegations from Connecticut. The list of names should be complete, but other data may be incomplete.

Current representatives 
 : John B. Larson (D) (since 1999)
 : Joe Courtney (D) (since 2007)
 : Rosa DeLauro (D) (since 1991)
 : Jim Himes (D) (since 2009)
 : Jahana Hayes (D) (since 2019)

List of members

See also

United States congressional delegations from Connecticut
List of United States senators from Connecticut
Connecticut's congressional districts

External links

Connecticut
 
Representatives